Chew Moor railway station briefly served the village of Chew Moor, between Lostock and Westhoughton, England.

History 
The station was opened in 1848 by the Liverpool and Bury Railway. In August 1852 the company opened Lostock Junction station less than a mile to the north, rendering Chew Moor surplus to requirements.

Location 
Chew Moor station was situated immediately north of what is now the M61 overbridge across the line.

By 2016, no trace of the station could be seen. The double tracks through the site were in use as part of the Manchester to Southport Line and were planned to be electrified.

References

Sources

Disused railway stations in the Metropolitan Borough of Bolton
Former Lancashire and Yorkshire Railway stations
Railway stations in Great Britain opened in 1848
Railway stations in Great Britain closed in 1852